Cindy Rarick (born September 12, 1959) is an American professional golfer. She competed as Cindy Flom in 1985 and from 1999 to 2001.

Amateur career 
Rarick was born in Glenwood, Minnesota. In 1994, she was inducted into the Sahuaro High School Alumni (Cougar Foundation) Hall of Fame.

Rarick was the 1977 Arizona State Junior champion. In 1978, she won the Hawaii Women's Match Play Championship, and a year later she captured the Hawaii Stroke Play Championship title. She attended the University of Hawaii.

Professional career 
Rarick joined the LPGA Tour in 1985. She won five tournaments on the Tour, her first in 1987. She also won the Gatorade Most Improved Player Award that year. Her highest finish on the money list was 10th in 1990. She also finished eleventh on the money list twice, in 1987 and 1989.

Professional wins

LPGA Tour wins (5)

LPGA Tour playoff record (1–2)

LPGA of Japan Tour wins (1)
1987 Fujisankei Ladies Classic

Legends Tour wins (1)
2005 BJ's Charity Championship	(with Jan Stephenson; tie with Pat Bradley and Patty Sheehan)

Team appearances
Professional
Handa Cup (representing the United States): 2006 (winners), 2007 (winners), 2008 (winners), 2009 (winners), 2010 (winners), 2011 (winners), 2012 (tie, Cup retained), 2013

References

External links 

American female golfers
LPGA Tour golfers
Golfers from Minnesota
Golfers from Arizona
Sahuaro High School alumni
University of Hawaiʻi at Mānoa alumni
People from Glenwood, Minnesota
Sportspeople from Tucson, Arizona
1959 births
Living people
21st-century American women